Numerous military installations in the United States are named after general officers in the Confederate States Army (CSA). These are all U.S. Army or Army National Guard posts, named mostly following World War I and during the 1940s. In 2021, the United States Congress created The Naming Commission, a United States government commission, in order to rename military assets that have names associated with the CSA. On 5 January 2023 William A. LaPlante, US under-secretary of defense for acquisition and sustainment (USD (A&S)) directed the full implementation of the recommendations of the Naming Commission, DoD-wide.

Active installations 
There are nine major U.S. military bases named in honor of Confederate military leaders, all in former Confederate States:

  Fort Benning (1917), near Columbus, Georgia, named after Henry L. Benning, a brigadier general in the Confederate States Army
  Fort Bragg (1918), in North Carolina, named for Confederate General Braxton Bragg
   Fort Gordon (1917), near Augusta, Georgia, named in honor of John Brown Gordon, who was a major general in the Confederate army
  Fort A.P. Hill (1941), near Bowling Green, Virginia, named for Virginia native and Confederate Lieutenant General A. P. Hill
  Fort Hood (1942), in Killeen, Texas, named after Confederate General John Bell Hood, who is best known for commanding the Texas Brigade during the American Civil War
  Fort Lee (1917), in Prince George County, Virginia, named for Confederate General Robert E. Lee
  Fort Pickett (1942), near Blackstone, Virginia, a Virginia National Guard installation named for Confederate General George Pickett
  Fort Polk (1941), near Leesville, Louisiana, named in honor of the Right Reverend Leonidas Polk, an Episcopal bishop and Confederate general
  Fort Rucker (1942), in Dale County, Alabama, named for Edmund Rucker, a colonel appointed acting brigadier general in November 1864, whose promotion went unconfirmed by the Confederate Congress (disbanded March 18, 1865)

Former installations that were given to the states
The following installations were transferred over to their respective state's National Guard units and are not considered to be assets of the Federal government nor part of The Naming Commission's mandate:

 Camp Beauregard, near Pineville, Louisiana, a Louisiana National Guard installation named for Louisiana native and Confederate General Pierre Gustave Toutant Beauregard
 Camp Maxey, near Paris, Texas, a Texas National Guard installation named after Confederate Brigadier General Samuel B. Maxey.
 Camp Pendleton, in Virginia Beach, Virginia, a Virginia National Guard installation named after Confederate Brigadier General William N. Pendleton

Deactivated installations
Other 20th century installations, now deactivated, named for Confederate Generals were: 
Camp Breckinridge, in Kentucky, named for John C. Breckinridge
Camp Forrest, a large WWII-era training base near Tullahoma, Tennessee named for Nathan Bedford Forrest, now the site of Arnold Air Force Base
Camp Pike, a U.S. Army Reserve installation co-located with Camp Joseph T. Robinson outside Little Rock, Arkansas named after Confederate General Albert Pike
Camp Van Dorn, another massive WWII-era training facility near Centreville, Mississippi named for CSA Maj. Gen. Earl Van Dorn
Camp Wheeler, in Georgia, named for Joseph Wheeler

Calls to rename 

In 2015, the Pentagon declared it would not rename any military installations named after Confederate generals, saying “the naming occurred in the spirit of reconciliation, not division”, and declined to make further comment in 2017.

Following the June 2020 nationwide protests over the murder of George Floyd by a police officer, the U.S. military began rethinking its traditional connection to Confederate Army symbols, including base names. The use of confederate flags, and statues or memorials dedicated to Confederate Army officers, has been seen as part of racism in the country. In 2021, the United States Congress created The Naming Commission in order to rename military assets that have names associated with the Confederacy. The Naming Commission is mandated by Section 370 of the United States National Defense Authorization Act for Fiscal Year 2021 (NDAA), enacted on January 1, 2021. Within three years of enactment, the United States Secretary of Defense is required to implement a plan developed by the Commission and to "remove all names, symbols, displays, monuments, and paraphernalia that honor or commemorate the Confederate States of America or any person who served voluntarily with the Confederate States of America from all assets of the Department of Defense."

See also
 Fort Belvoir, which was renamed from honoring a Union general to one honoring a slave plantation in 1935 and has also attracted support for potential renaming
 List of name changes due to the George Floyd protests

References

Army installations
Confederate
Army installations, Confederate
Lost Cause of the Confederacy